Still Lovin' You or Still Loving You may refer to:
"Still Lovin' You", a song covered by Pablo Carrasco from Blind Auditions aired Oct 1, 2018 in La Voz Argentina
"Still Lovin' You", a song by Stephanie Mills from the album Tantalizingly Hot, 1982
"Still  Lovin' You", a 2014 song by Namie Amuro
Still Lovin' You, a 2003 album by Robert Bradley's Blackwater Surprise
"Still Loving You", a song by Scorpions from the album Love at First Sting, 1984